Corazzari is a surname. Notable people with the surname include:

Bruno Corazzari (born 1940), Italian actor
Cristiano Corazzari (born 1975), Italian politician

Italian-language surnames